Michael Hamilton may refer to:

 Michael Hamilton (politician) (1918–2000), British Conservative Party politician
 Mike Hamilton (athletic director) (born 1963), former director of men's athletics at the University of Tennessee
 Mike Hamilton (guitarist), American guitarist, singer and songwriter
 Michael Hamilton (American football) (born 1973), American football player
 Michael Hamilton, character in The Cloverfield Paradox